The following lists events that happened during 1887 in Australia.

Incumbents
Premier of New South Wales – Patrick Jenning (until 19 January), then Henry Parkes
Premier of South Australia – John Downer (until 11 June), then Thomas Playford II
Premier of Queensland – Samuel Griffith
Premier of Tasmania – James Agnew (until 29 March), then Philip Fysh
Premier of Victoria – Duncan Gillies
Governor of the Crown Colony of Western Australia – Sir Frederick Broome

Events
 1 January – Clement Wragge is appointed Government Meteorologist for Queensland
 21 January – Brisbane receives a daily rainfall of 465 millimetres (18.3 inches), a record for any Australian capital city.
 23 March – 81 miners are killed during a coal gas explosion at Bulli, New South Wales
 22 April – A cyclone hits a pearling fleet off Eighty Mile Beach, 120 men drown.
 22 June – The Fremantle Town Hall is opened.
 26 Sept – The Celtic Club Melbourne is formed and remains today as Australia's oldest Irish Club
 19 October – The Sydney-bound steamer SS Cheviot is wrecked near Point Nepean, Victoria, claiming 35 lives.

Science and technology
Construction of Goulburn Weir commenced, one of Australia's earliest irrigation schemes.

Arts and literature

Sport
 Dunlop wins the Melbourne Cup

Births
 2 February – Pat Sullivan, film director (died 1933)
 16 April – Henry Gordon Bennett, soldier (died 1962)
 6 July – Annette Kellerman, swimming celebrity ( died 1975 )

Deaths

References

 
Australia
Years of the 19th century in Australia